Bresje may refer to one of either three villages in Serbia:

Bresje (Jagodina)
Bresje (Svilajnac)
 Bresje, Kosovo Polje